Kevin Padian (born 1951) is a Professor of Integrative Biology at the University of California, Berkeley, Curator of Paleontology, University of California Museum of Paleontology and was President of the National Center for Science Education from 2007 to 2008. Padian's area of interest is in vertebrate evolution, especially the origins of flight and the evolution of birds from theropod dinosaurs.  He served as an expert witness for the plaintiffs in the Kitzmiller v. Dover Area School District trial, and his testimony was repeatedly cited in the court's decision.

Padian received a bachelor's degree in Natural Science and a Master of Arts degree in Teaching from Colgate University, and a Ph.D. from Yale University, where he focused on the evolution of flight in pterosaurs. He subsequently became interested in paleobiology, especially using paleohistology. He developed this research program in collaboration with Armand de Ricqlès and Jack Horner. In addition to his work at Berkeley, Padian taught science in high school and was principal author of the California Science Framework  K–12.  In 2003 he received Wonderfest's Carl Sagan Prize for Science Popularization.

He has cowritten several papers with John R. Horner and Armand de Ricqlès based on histological analysis of fossil bones from the UCMP as well as the Museum of the Rockies.

Padian has authored over 100 scientific articles.

In 2007, Padian was made a Fellow of the American Association for the Advancement of Science.

He supervised several doctoral students who developed distinguished careers of their own, such as Jacques Gauthier, Timothy Rowe, and John Hutchinson.

References

External links
Padian Lab at University of California Museum of Paleontology
UCMP Profile 
Interview on Evolution

American paleontologists
1951 births
Living people
Colgate University alumni
Yale University alumni
Fellows of the American Association for the Advancement of Science
University of California, Berkeley faculty
Scientists from New York (state)